Nebulosa albitumida is a moth of the family Notodontidae. It is found along the eastern slope of the Andes in south-eastern Ecuador.

References

Moths described in 1902
Notodontidae of South America